Subbuteo is a tabletop football game in which players simulate association football by flicking miniature players with their fingers. The name is derived from the neo-Latin scientific name Falco subbuteo (a bird of prey commonly known as the Eurasian hobby), after a trademark was not granted to its creator Peter Adolph (1916–1994) to call the game "Hobby".

While most closely associated with the football game, versions of Subbuteo based on other team sports such as cricket, both codes of rugby and hockey have also been produced.

History 

Subbuteo was invented by Peter Adolph (1916–1994), who was demobbed from the Royal Air Force after the end of World War II. Searching for a new business opportunity he turned his attention to creating a new table-top football game. He adapted his game from Newfooty, a table football game that had been invented in 1929 by William Lane Keeling of Liverpool. He made numerous improvements, including changing the heavy lead bases under the model players to lighter materials, using for his prototype a button from his mother's coat and a washer.

In August 1946 Peter Adolph filed an outline patent application for the game, which was not finalised until May 1947. The August 1946 edition of The Boy's Own Paper first announced Subbuteo's availability and offered to send details, but sets were not available until March 1947. According to rumours, after the early adverts, orders started to pour in as Adolph set about converting his patent idea into a deliverable product.

The first Subbuteo sets, known as the Assembly Outfits, consisted of goals made of wire with paper nets, a cellulose acetate ball, cardboard playing figures in two basic kits (red shirts with white shorts, and blue shirts with white shorts) and bases made from buttons weighed down with lead washers. The story is that Peter found one of his mother's coat buttons and used Woolworth buttons for the early set bases. No pitch was provided: instead, the purchaser was given instructions on how to mark out (with chalk, provided) a playing area on to a blanket (an old army blanket was recommended). The first sets were eventually available in March 1947, several months after the original advertisement appeared. The first figures were made of flat cardboard cut out of a long strip. Later these card players came in press-out strips before being replaced with two-dimensional celluloid figures, known to collectors as "flats".

Early production of Subbuteo was centred in Langton Green, near Tunbridge Wells in Kent. Following the advent of the OO scale players the player figures were individually hand painted by local outworkers in their own homes.

In its early years, Subbuteo had a fierce rivalry with Newfooty. In the run up to Christmas 1961 Adolph introduced a three-dimensional handpainted plastic figure into the range. After several design modifications, this figure evolved by 1967 into the classic "heavyweight" figure pictured. Newfooty ceased trading in 1961 after a failed television advertising campaign but its demise is thought to be linked to the launch of the moulded Subbuteo players. There were several further evolutions of figure design. In 1978 the "zombie" figure was introduced to facilitate the machine painting of figures. After much negative feedback, the zombie figure was replaced in 1980 by the "lightweight" figure that continued until the 1990s when Hasbro acquired Waddingtons Games, which owned Subbuteo. 

After Hasbro bought John Waddington in 1994, Subbuteo sales declined from about 150,000 sets per year to 3,000 in 2002 and just 500 sets in 2003, when production was stopped.  

Hasbro relaunched Subbuteo in 2005 with flat photorealistic card-style figures on bases, rather than three-dimensional figures. The relaunch was not a success and was again discontinued.

In 2012, Hasbro licensed Subbuteo to Eleven Force and it returned to the shops with new style three-dimensional rubber figures, launching Subbuteo into its eighth decade of production. Subbuteo also made other things for the collector, such as stands to create a stadium, cups, crowds, policemen and much more.

In 2020, Hasbro awarded the licence to Longshore, although Eleven Force remained Subbueto's Spanish distributor. It was reported that Hasbro had been unhappy with Elevenforce's lack of interest in markets outside Spain. In May 2020, Subbuteo World, a long-term UK seller of Subbuteo, announced it was advising Longshore. It also advised there will be new teams, a Subbuteo VAR set and new fences. 

Subbuteo is a registered trademark of Hasbro Inc.

Gameplay 

Playing Subbuteo is a physical simulation of association football, involving dexterity and skill in flicking the playing figures, which stand on weighted bases, across the tabletop pitch towards the ball.

What makes the game different from most other tabletop sports games are the hundreds of team kits and accessories. While most games feature only two teams (usually "red vs blue" or "white vs black"), Subbuteo has several hundred team designs, almost all representing real teams, with the notable exception of comic book legends Melchester Rovers. While there were many famous teams such as Chelsea, Manchester City, and Real Madrid, these were complemented by many unique sides, such as Boston Minutemen, Landskrona, Antwerp, Hartford Bicentennials, Admira Wacker, and even unpainted models. There are also many additional accessories, such as new balls and goals, special figures for free kicks and throw-ins, stands and crowd, linesmen, ball-boys, streakers and policemen, floodlights, TV cameras and even a mini-Her Majesty the Queen to present the FA Cup.

The rules attempt to correspond as closely as possible with association football. However, the necessary simplifications involved in some ways complicate things further. Players maintain possession as long as the figure they flick makes contact with the ball and the ball does not subsequently hit an opposing figure, although the same figure cannot be used for more than three consecutive flicks. Shots at goal can be taken only once the ball is over the 'shooting line', a line parallel to and equidistant between the goal line and half-way line. The goalkeeper figures are attached to, and manoeuvered with, a rod that fits underneath the back of the goal. The offside law is in effect, but only pertaining to figures that are forward of the opposing team's shooting line (as opposed to the half-way line, as in actual football).

See also 

 Table football
 Table cricket

References

Further reading 

 Payne, Richard (1996) Fifty Years Of Flicking Football, Yore Publications. 
 Daniel Tatarsky (2004) Flick to Kick: An Illustrated History of Subbuteo, Orion. 
 Adolph, Mark (2006) Growing up with Subbuteo, SportsBooks Limited. 
 Willetts, Paul (2008) Teenage Flicks Memories Of The Sub-Beautiful Game, Dexter Haven Publishing.

External links 

 
 
 The Independent Subbuteo Forum The Independent Subbuteo Forum is the main Subbuteo reference website and message board in the UK.
 Subbuteo Rules Subbuteo instructions in 12 languages 
 Subbuteo Online, Subbuteo Blog and News Site
 Greats of the past: Michael M Dent

Board games introduced in 1947
Games of physical skill
Miniatures games
Waddingtons games
Hasbro games
Borough of Tunbridge Wells
British games